Capronia suijae is a species of lichenicolous fungus in the family Herpotrichiellaceae. Found in Belarus, it was formally described as a new species in 2017 by Andrei Tsurykau and Javier Etayo. The type specimen was collected from Ostrozhanka Village (Lyelchytsy District) where it was found growing on the thallus of the bark-dwelling, crustose lichen Xanthoria parietina; Muellerella lichenicola was also simultaneously parasitizing the lichen. Capronia suijae is only known to occur at the type locality. The species epithet suijae honours Estonian lichenologist Ave Suija, "in recognition of her important contribution to the knowledge of lichenicolous fungi".

References

Eurotiomycetes
Fungi described in 2017
Lichenicolous fungi
Fungi of Europe
Taxa named by Javier Angel Etayo Salazar